Romanini is a surname. Notable people with this surname include:

 Diego Romanini, an Italian auto racing driver
 Roberto Romanini, Italian lightweight rower
 Samuele Romanini, Italian bobsledder